Lambda Iota Society was a local fraternity at the University of Vermont until it merged with Pi Kappa Phi in 2018.

History
The Fraternity began as a secret literary society. There were thirteen original members who met regularly to share the written and spoken word. The Founders were:

Until its loss of university recognition in 2007, Lambda Iota was the oldest existing local fraternity in the state of Vermont and the eighth oldest fraternity in the nation.  Members included statesmen, academics, and successful businessmen.

The place that members called home since the completion of the structure in 1913 is located at 440 Pearl Street, Burlington, Vermont.  Members of Lambda Iota were commonly known as "Owls" after their mascot.

In 2007, the society lost university recognition for 8 years.  Following this, a federal investigation was conducted surrounding cocaine trafficking that had occurred at a house owned by the society.

On  the young Kappa Rho chapter of Pi Kappa Phi fraternity on the Vermont campus was renamed as the Lambda Iota chapter in a partnership with Lambda Iota Society alumni, and took up residence in the historic Pearl Street mansion. Remaining a chapter of Pi Kappa Phi, the two organizations thus re-established in this fashion the underground local fraternity as a recognized campus community member.

The Minervan Education Foundation
Since the late 1990s, a group of older Owls have been working to develop a charitable foundation to assist current Owls with financial assistance for their studies.  Since its creation, the foundation has raised thousands of dollars through donations and other charitable ventures.

See also
 Owls
 Pi Kappa Phi
List of social fraternities and sororities

Notes

References
 Lambda Iota Website
 Vermont Cynic - The story of Lambda Iota

1836 establishments in Vermont
Local fraternities and sororities
Fraternities and sororities in the United States
Student organizations established in 1836